Casale Corte Cerro is a comune (municipality) in the Province of Verbano-Cusio-Ossola in the Italian region Piedmont, located about  northeast of Turin and about  west of Verbania. It was part of the Mountain Community of Strona and Basso Toce until 2010 when it merged with the Mountain community Due Laghi, Cusio, Mottarone and Strona, which ceased to exist in 2012. Today the town is part of the mountain union of Cusio and Mottarone.

Casale Corte Cerro borders the following municipalities: Germagno, Gravellona Toce, Loreglia, Omegna, Ornavasso.

References

External links
 Official website

Cities and towns in Piedmont